Semyonovskaya is a rural locality (a village) in Almozerskoye Rural Settlement, Vytegorsky District, Vologda Oblast, Russia. The population was 22 as of 2002.

Geography 
Semyonovskaya is located 68 km south of Vytegra (the district's administrative centre) by road. Karpovskaya is the nearest rural locality.

References 

Rural localities in Vytegorsky District